Sarule is a comune (municipality) in the Province of Nuoro in the Italian region Sardinia, located about  north of Cagliari and about  southwest of Nuoro.

Sarule borders the following municipalities: Mamoiada, Ollolai, Olzai, Orani, Ottana.

Demographic evolution

References

External links

 www.conunesarule.it/

Cities and towns in Sardinia